Jens Harskov Loczi (born 23 July 1963) is a Danish sports shooter. He competed at the 1992 Summer Olympics and the 1996 Summer Olympics.

References

1963 births
Living people
Danish male sport shooters
Olympic shooters of Denmark
Shooters at the 1992 Summer Olympics
Shooters at the 1996 Summer Olympics
Place of birth missing (living people)